Year 444 (CDXLIV) was a leap year starting on Saturday (link will display the full calendar) of the Julian calendar. At the time, it was known as the Year of the Consulship of Theodosius and Aginatius (or, less frequently, year 1197 Ab urbe condita). The denomination 444 for this year has been used since the early medieval period, when the Anno Domini calendar era became the prevalent method in Europe for naming years.

Events 
<onlyinclude>

By place

Europe 
 Flavius Aetius, Roman general (magister militum), settles the Alans around Valence and Orléans, to contain unrest in Brittany.
 Eudocia, eldest daughter of Emperor Valentinian III, is betrothed to Huneric, son of Vandal King Genseric (hostage in Italy).
 Attila the Hun establishes his residence along the Tisza River (modern Hungary), and plans the coming campaign in the Balkans.
 A "pestilence" that is probably cyprian plague strikes the British Isles, and makes the country vulnerable to internal revolts.
 The Irish city of Armagh is founded by Saint Patrick the Great.

By topic

Religion 
 Pope Leo I extinguishes the Gallican vicariate.
 Dioscorus I becomes Patriarch of Alexandria.

Births 
 Xiao Ni, prince of Southern Qi (d. 492)

Deaths 
 Bricius, bishop of Tours
 Cyril of Alexandria, patriarch and theologian
 Juqu Wuhui, prince of Northern Liang

References